Frankie Beverly (born Howard Beverly, December 6, 1946) is an American singer, musician, songwriter, and producer, known primarily for his recordings with the soul and funk band Maze.  Beverly formed Maze, originally called Raw Soul, in his hometown of Philadelphia in 1970.  After a relocation to San Francisco and an introduction to Marvin Gaye, Maze went on to release nine Gold albums and create a large and devoted following.  Beverly is the band's writer, producer and lead singer.  He is known for his distinctive smooth baritone voice and charismatic stage presence.

Early life and career
Beverly was born in Philadelphia, Pennsylvania, United States, and started out singing gospel music as a schoolboy in a local church. He was raised in the East Germantown section of the city and was a graduate of the now defunct Germantown High School.

As a teenager he formed The Blenders, a short-lived a cappella, doo-wop group that were influenced by The Dells, The Moonglows, and The Del Vikings. After that outfit dissolved, he founded The Butlers (subsequently Frankie Beverly and the Butlers), which would be the first group he recorded with in 1963. In 1967, he cut "If That's What You Wanted", which became a Northern soul standard. As time passed, they caught the attention of the record producer Kenny Gamble, who eventually released recordings by the group.

It turned out that music performed by The Butlers did not fit into the "Philly Sound", and after some heavy touring, the group relocated to California. The unit was re-christened as Raw Soul and caught the attention of a sister-in-law to Marvin Gaye. Gaye featured them as an opening act at his shows, and also convinced Beverly to change the band's name to Maze.

The group's popularity was enhanced considerably in the UK by DJs Greg Edwards and Robbie Vincent in the late 1970s and early 1980s when they performed live at London's Lyceum Ballroom for broadcast on Capital Radio.  They are best known there for their UK No. 57 hit single, "Joy and Pain".

In 2019, Beverly's hit single with Maze "Before I Let Go" was covered by American singer Beyoncé as a bonus track on her fifth live album Homecoming: The Live Album. Beverly told Billboard that the cover was "one of the high points of (his) life... in a class of its own" and made him "feel bigger than ever! I feel like I have a huge smash out there."

Style
Beverly's onstage attire (all-white custom designed and made, casual clothing, including slacks, long-sleeved shirt, and a baseball cap) has become his signature dress style over the years. It has become tradition for the audience to wear all white to the concerts in honor of the group.

His son, Anthony, who has toured as a drummer with Maze, organized a tribute album to his father called 'Silky Soul Music...an All-Star Tribute to Maze Featuring Frankie Beverly' in 2009, founding the record label Brantera, as an homage to the work of Maze. Mary J. Blige, Kenneth Brian Edmonds (Babyface) and Mint Condition were among the artists taking part on the album.

References

External links
MazeMuze biography

NPR audio feature: Frankie Beverly, the Soul of Maze with Ed Gordon
PBS audio feature: Frankie Beverly with Tavis Smiley 
75-minute audio mix of Maze songs with dialogue from Frankie Beverly

African-American record producers
Record producers from Pennsylvania
20th-century African-American male singers
American male singers
American rhythm and blues singers
American soul musicians
Songwriters from Pennsylvania
Musicians from Philadelphia
1946 births
Living people
Northern soul musicians
Singers from Pennsylvania
American funk musicians
African-American songwriters
21st-century African-American people
American male songwriters